The 2015 AFC Champions League qualifying play-off was played from 4 to 17 February 2015. A total of 25 teams competed in the qualifying play-off to decide eight of the 32 places in the group stage of the 2015 AFC Champions League.

Format
The bracket for the qualifying play-off, which consisted of three rounds (preliminary round 1, preliminary round 2, and play-off round), was determined by the AFC based on the association ranking of each team. Each tie was played as a single match, with the team from the higher-ranked association hosting the match. Extra time and penalty shoot-out were used to decide the winner if necessary. The winners of each tie in the play-off round advanced to the group stage to join the 24 automatic qualifiers. All losers in each round which were from associations with only play-off slots entered the AFC Cup group stage.

Teams
The following 25 teams (11 from West Zone, 14 from East Zone) were involved in the qualifying play-off:

Schedule
The schedule of the competition was as follows.

Bracket

Play-off West 1
Al-Ahli advanced to Group D.

Play-off West 2
Naft Tehran advanced to Group B.

Play-off West 3
Bunyodkor advanced to Group A.

Play-off West 4
Al-Sadd advanced to Group C.

Play-off East 1
FC Seoul advanced to Group H.

Play-off East 2
Kashiwa Reysol advanced to Group E.

Play-off East 3
Guangzhou R&F advanced to Group F.

Play-off East 4
Beijing Guoan advanced to Group G.

Preliminary round 1

|-
|+East Zone

|}

Preliminary round 2

|-
|+West Zone

|+East Zone

|}

Play-off round

|-
|+West Zone

|+East Zone

|}

References

External links
AFC Champions League, the-AFC.com

1